John Baily may refer to:

John Walker Baily (1809–1873), English archaeologist
John Baily (MP), MP for Chippenham
John Baily (priest) (died 1495), Canon of Windsor

See also
John Bailey (disambiguation)
John Baillie (disambiguation)
John Bayley (disambiguation)